D. M. H Obaidur Raza Chowdhury (1921-1982) is a Awami League politician and the former Member of Parliament of Sylhet-5.

Career
Chowdhury was elected to parliament from Sylhet-5 as a Awami League candidate in 1970.

References

Awami League politicians
1921 births
Pakistani MNAs 1972–1977
1982 deaths